List of Tulu language films produced in the Tulu film industry in 2014. Tulu is a language of India. The first Tulu language film was released in 1971.

Releases

See also
List of Tulu films of 2019
List of Tulu films of 2018
List of Tulu films of 2017
List of Tulu films of 2016
List of Tulu films of 2015
List of Released Tulu films
Tulu cinema
 Tulu Movie Actors
 Tulu Movie Actresses
Karnataka State Film Award for Best Regional film
RED FM Tulu Film Awards
Tulu Cinemotsava 2015

References

Tulu
Tulu-language films
Tulu